Hyde Chapel is located in Ridgeway, Wisconsin. Originally a place of worship for Congregationalists, it also become open to Lutherans, Baptists, Methodists and Roman Catholics. It was added to the National Register of Historic Places in 1988.  Today, an active Hyde Community Association preserves the structure and the spirit of this tiny country Chapel. Meetings are held at the Chapel in the Spring and Fall where members, friends and family gather for indoor and outdoor clean-up projects followed by a pot-luck luncheon. In December an annual holiday party is celebrated. The public is always welcome.  http://www.hydechapel.com/

References

Properties of religious function on the National Register of Historic Places in Wisconsin
Chapels in the United States
Buildings and structures in Iowa County, Wisconsin
National Register of Historic Places in Iowa County, Wisconsin
Historic districts on the National Register of Historic Places in Wisconsin